A Chatcord is a low cost and compact device that connects the duplex audio stream between the sound card of the computer and the telephone-set. It enables the use of a Plain Old Telephone System (POTS) to talk via the Internet away from the computer, after a connection is established from the desktop using your specific softphone (such as MSN or Skype).

A number of cheap and compact devices exist, as well as many Do It Yourself web pages where instructions for assembling one are given.

A quick web search on 'chatcord' will yield numerous results, both as DIY schematics and commercial.

External links
Search for 'chatcord' on Google.
https://web.archive.org/web/20061127044532/http://walle.nerdhero.org/chatcord/: Chatcord DIY (not tested, use at your own risk).
http://www.chat-cord.com/: For-sale chatcords.
http://www.grynx.com: Another DIY Chatcord, uses a couple of accessible electrical components and uses either a 9v battery or USB cable for power

Computer peripherals